There are a number of methods to input Esperanto letters and text on a computer, e.g. when using a word processor or email. Input methods depend on a computer's operating system. Specifically the characters ĵ, ĝ, ĉ, ĥ, ŭ, ŝ can be problematic.

All modern email clients and servers accept Unicode text as UTF-8 in at least one of the following Content-Transfer-Encoding types: 8bit, quoted-printable, or base64. Esperanto text will normally be transmitted in UTF-8 with a Content-Transfer-Encoding of either 8bit (if the server supports it) or (failing that) quoted-printable.

Time and date format among Esperantists is not standardized, but of course "internationally unambiguous" formats such as 2020-10-11 (or 11-okt-2020) are preferred when the date is not spelled out in full (e.g., "la 11-a de oktobro 2020").

Reference 
The Esperanto alphabet is part of the Latin-3 and Unicode character sets, and is included in WGL4. The code points and HTML entities for the Esperanto characters not part of the ISO basic Latin alphabet are:

The code points and HTML entities for the English characters not used are:

Microsoft Windows
Adjusting a keyboard to type Unicode is relatively simple (all Windows variants of the Microsoft Windows NT family, such as 2000 and XP, for example, support Unicode; Windows 9x does not natively support Unicode).

The Canadian Multilingual Standard layout is preinstalled in MS Windows.
The US international layout can type the circumflex over vowels, but needs to be modified to enable Esperanto letters. This can be done using Microsoft Keyboard Layout Creator or by using a layout provided for this purpose, e.g. EoKlavaro. EoKlavaro gives access also to many other European language characters.

Another more recent free download to adapt a Windows keyboard for Esperanto letters is Tajpi - Esperanto Keyboard for Windows 2000 / XP / Vista / 7 / 8 by Thomas James. As cons some configuration could suppress hotkeys, like Ctrl+W to close browser tab, it will type ŭ instead.

A simple and free utility with all the Esperanto keys already installed is called Esperanto keyboard layout for Microsoft Windows – (QWERTY version) this is available as a free download.

A similar tool is Ek, and is available without charge. You can download the keyboard by clicking on Instalilo: ek(version#)inst.exe. Ek uses the cx keying function to produce ĉ. It will work with most programs but there are some that it is not compatible with.

A commercial but still cheap tool is Šibboleth, a program that can produce every Latin character. It enables composition of ĝ etc. using the ^ deadkey (like for French letters), so one does not have to learn new key positions. The ŭ is produced by the combination u followed by #.

If one wants to use a text editor that is Esperanto-compatible, make sure it supports Unicode, as do Editplus (UTF-8), UniRed and Vim.

Linux
Since 2009 it has been very easy to add key combinations for accented Esperanto letters to one's usual keyboard layout, at least in Gnome and KDE. No download is required. The keyboard layout options can be modified under System Preferences. The options to choose are "Adding Esperanto circumflexes (supersigno)" and the appropriate keyboard layout (Qwerty or Dvorak). A third level shift key is also required: under "Key to choose 3rd level", e.g. LeftWin.

In older systems it may be necessary to activate Unicode by setting the locale to a UTF-8 locale. There is a special eo_XX.UTF-8 locale available at Bertil Wennergren's home page, along with a thorough explanation of how one implements Unicode and the keyboard in Linux.

If the Linux system is recent, or kept updated, then the system is probably already working with Esperanto keys. For X11 and KDE, it's only necessary to switch to a keyboard layout that has Latin dead keys (for example, the "US International" keyboard), whenever the user wants to write in Esperanto. Some keyboards with dead keys are:

In the US International keyboard, the dead circumflex is over the "6" key ("shift-6") and the dead breve is hidden over the "9" key ("altgr-shift-9").
It also can be combined with any vowel to type â, ê, î, ô, û and ŷ.  and then  will produce the caret symbol itself (^). 
In the Brazilian ABNT2 keyboard, the dead circumflex has its own key together with dead tilde ("shift-~"), near the "Enter" key. The dead breve is hidden over the backslash ("altgr-shift-\") key.
In the Portuguese keyboard, the dead tilde key, near the left shift key, has both the dead circumflex and the dead breve.
On French and Belgian keyboards, the same dead key (the one right of ) used to produce French â ê î ô û ŷ when followed by a vowel will usually also produce ĉ ĝ ĥ ĵ ŝ when followed by the appropriate consonant. ++ the key which would be a dead-grave when used with  without  (on Belgian keyboards, ++ which can be on the top or middle row) is usually a dead-breve, i.e. use it before hitting  in order to get ŭ.

Another option is to use a keyboard layout that supports the Compose key (usually mapped to the right alt or to one of the windows keys). Then, "compose-u u" will combine the character u with the breve, and "compose-shift-6 s" will combine the character s with the circumflex (assuming "shift-6" is the position of the caret).

In GNOME, there exists a separate keyboard layout for Esperanto, replacing unused characters in Esperanto with the non-ASCII characters. A separate keyboard layout for Esperanto is available in KDE, too.

If necessary, install and use high quality fonts that have Esperanto glyphs, like Microsoft Web core fonts (free for personal use) or DejaVu (The Bitstream Vera glyphs have the Bitstream Vera license and DejaVu extensions are in public domain).

There is also an applet available for the gnome-panel called "Character Palette" and one can add the following characters to a new palette for quick placement from their panel menu bar:  
 Ĉ ĉ Ĝ ĝ Ĥ ĥ Ĵ ĵ Ŝ ŝ Ŭ ŭ
The Character Palette applet makes for a quick and easy way to add Esperanto characters to a web browser or text document. One need only select their newly created palette and click a letter, and that letter will be on their system clipboard waiting to be pasted into the document.

macOS
On macOS systems Esperanto characters can be entered by selecting a keyboard layout from the "Input Sources" pane of "Language & Text" preferences, found in the "System Preferences" application, and the pre-installed ABC Extended keyboard layout can be used to type Esperanto's diacritics. When this layout is active, Esperanto characters can be entered using multiple keystrokes using a simple mnemonic device:  contains the caret character, which looks like a circumflex, so  places a caret over the following character. Similarly,  stands for breve, so  adds the breve mark over the next character.

One can also download an Esperanto keyboard layout package that will, once installed, function in the same way as other languages' keyboards. When installed, this gives users two different methods of typing. The first, Esperanto maintains a QWERTY layout, but switches the letters that are not used in Esperanto (q, w, y, and x) for diacritical letters and makes a u into a ŭ if it follows an a or an e. The second method, Esperanto-sc, is more familiar to QWERTY users and allows the user to type in most Latin-scripted languages and Esperanto simultaneously. It treats the keys that take diacritics (a, s, e, c, g, h, u, and j) as dead keys, if a combining character is pressed afterwards—usually the semicolon. Both methods are also available using the less common Dvorak Keyboard.

A table of the input methods:

Swedish Esperantists using Mac OS X can use the Finnish Extended layout, which comes with the OS. Finnish has the same alphabet and type layout as Swedish; the Finnish Extended layout adds functionality just like ABC Extended, only using other key combinations (the breve appears when one types | and the circumflex when one types |).

Similarly, British users may use the Irish Extended layout, which differs from the ABC Extended keyboard layout in several ways (preserving the simple option+vowel method of applying acute accents, important for the Irish language, and the £ sign on shift-3 like the UK layout), but uses the same "dead-keys" for modifiers as ABC Extended for Esperanto characters.

In OS X it is also possible to create one's own keyboard layouts, so it is relatively easy to have more convenient mappings, like for example one based on typing an x after the letter.

There is still no integrated solution for typing Esperanto-characters with AZERTY keyboards. Dead-circumflex followed by a consonant may or may not work for ĉ ĝ ĥ ĵ ŝ; and if nothing else avails, ù is a tolerable if imperfect approximation for ŭ.

See also 

 Esperanto orthography
 Substitutions of diacritic characters in Esperanto

References

External links
Computer input
Amiketo is software that support the Esperanto alphabet in Windows , Mac OS , and Linux 
Online Esperanto keyboard
Esperanto QWERTY keyboard for Windows using spare keys
Esperanto GKOS keyboard for Android phones/tablets with genuine support (language option in Tools menu)
Tajpi - Esperanto Keyboard for Windows 2000 / XP / Vista / 7 / 8 – free download
Unired – Unicode plain text editor for Windows 95/98/NT/2000 (with E-o support)

Esperanto
Latin-script keyboard layouts
Natural language and computing